"Swing, Swing" is a song by American rock band the All-American Rejects, released as their debut single from their self-titled debut studio album in December 2002.

Background
"Swing, Swing" was written by Nick Wheeler and Tyson Ritter. According to Ritter, the song was written in his grandparents' cabin in his hometown of Stillwater in Oklahoma when he came up with the chorus one weekend morning. "My ex-girlfriend and I had a rough relationship, and that was written when it sucked real bad," Ritter explained, "I liked this other chick, so that's what the second verse is about, moving on to a hotter chick - no I'm just kidding. Moving on to another girl... or just moving on."

The song was also one of the last to be written and recorded for the duo's self titled debut album "It was over and done with a year ago," Ritter said of the misery-inducing relationship that also inspired many other tear-jerking pop songs, such as "My Paper Heart" and "Don't Leave Me." "But I got a great record out of it... as far as lyrics. I didn't have to think too hard."

Reception

Critical reception
The song received generally positive reviews from music critics. Rockfeedback, who rated the track 3 out of 5 stars, reviewed the song as "Very polished, insanely catchy, and heart-on-sleeve this record is. Dramatically expressive lyrics ('Did you think that I would cry, on the phone...?', 'My heart is crushed by a former love!'), ultra-glossy production and a ridiculously infectious chorus: you wouldn't bet against them." Contactmusic.com said "The melody is appealing and its pop punk sounds like something from Simple Plan or Blink 182. The lyrics are slightly baffling with 'swing, swing, swing from the tangles of' - a classic example."

MusicOMH regarded "Swing, Swing" as "top form" and commented with "These small-town American, fun rockers are hard to dislike. Swing Swing swings along pleasantly enough, developing from an organ intro to a good-natured, old-style rock out that does just what you expect it to. Rock, that is", while City Life praised the track as "imaginative" and that "The use of a church organ gives way to a totally catchy - if formulaic - college rock anthem. Vocals are typically American high-pitched angst, while the simple "Swing-Swing" chorus should guarantee favourable radio play on both sides of the Atlantic."

Chart performance
Upon release, "Swing, Swing" gained attention on Los Angeles modern rock radio station KROQ-FM and WXRK in New York City. When The All-American Rejects was re-released in early 2003, "Swing, Swing" gained more commercial success; peaking at #8 on the US Billboard Modern Rock Tracks chart in March, #60 on the US Billboard Hot 100 chart and #13 UK Singles Charts in August for five weeks respectively. It is the band's highest charting single in the UK.

"Swing, Swing" was digitally released later in 2005; reaching #75 on the Billboard Hot Digital Songs, it also briefly returned to the UK Singles Chart in April 2009 at #99.

Music video
The music video for "Swing, Swing" was directed by Marcos Siega and shot in December 2002 in Los Angeles and was released on January 7, 2003. It involves the band performing the song in a small trailer park while scenes of a young couple going through their relationship are overlapped through the video - eventually ending with them breaking up.

Appearances in popular culture
"Swing, Swing" is featured on the soundtrack of the comedy film American Wedding, the video games Playboy: The Mansion, Lego Rock Band, MVP Baseball 2003 and on the compilation album Sky High Invasion - Volume 1 as a remix by DJ Loopy. Television-wise, the song has appeared in the American action series Smallville, the pilot episode of teen drama The O.C., Series 3, Episode 5 of the British topical news comedy show Russell Howard's Good News and was covered by the cast of the British drama series All the Small Things in character.

Track listing

Charts and awards

Weekly charts

Awards

Certifications

Release history

References 

2002 debut singles
Music videos directed by Marcos Siega
The All-American Rejects songs
2002 songs
Songs written by Tyson Ritter
DreamWorks Records singles
Songs written by Nick Wheeler